Toledo, stylized as TOLEDO, is an American indie rock duo from Newburyport, Massachusetts, now based in Brooklyn, New York. The duo consists of Daniel Alvarez and Jordan Dunn-Pilz.

History
Toledo released their first EP in early 2019, titled Hot Stuff. The duo's second EP, Jockeys of Love, was released on February 12, 2021. In June 2022, Toledo released a new song called "L-Train". In the fall of 2022, Toledo released their debut full-length album, How It Ends, through Grand Jury Records. In February 2023, the duo announced "How It Ends [UNRATED EDITION], a deluxe edition of their debut album, due out March 31. Alongside the announcement, they released the song "Oak Hill".

Discography
Studio albums
How It Ends (2022, Grand Jury)
EPs
Hot Stuff (2019, Telefono)
Jockeys of Love (2021, Telefono)

References

Musical groups established in 2019